Klay (Kle or Clay) is a town in Bomi County, Liberia, located about  to the north of the nation's capital city of Monrovia. In 2002, this town was attacked by LURD rebels, causing refugees to flee south and leave the town deserted.

See also 

 Railway stations in Liberia

References 

Populated places in Liberia
Bomi County